Deputy Assistant may refer to:

 Deputy assistant commissioner
 Deputy Assistant to the President 
 Deputy Assistant to the President for National Security Affairs